The 2002 North Texas Mean Green football team represented the University of North Texas in the 2002 NCAA Division I-A football season.

Schedule

References

North Texas
North Texas Mean Green football seasons
Sun Belt Conference football champion seasons
New Orleans Bowl champion seasons
North Texas Mean Green football